The second edition of the women's Strade Bianche was held on 5 March 2016, in Tuscany, Italy. British world champion Lizzie Armitstead won the race, in bad weather, ahead of Katarzyna Niewiadoma and Emma Johansson.

The women's Strade Bianche served as the first event of the inaugural UCI Women's World Tour, the highest level of professional women's cycling.  The race is organized on the same day as the men's event, at a shorter distance, but on much of the same roads.

Route
The Strade Bianche is a one day cycling race starting in and finishing in Siena, notorious for its long sections of white gravel roads (sterrati or strade bianche in Italian). The course runs over hilly terrain in the province of Siena, for a total of 121 km, featuring seven sectors and 22.4 km of dirt roads. Six sectors were in common with the men's route. The race finished on Siena's Piazza del Campo, after a narrow ascent on the roughly-paved Via Santa Caterina in the heart of the medieval city.

Results

See also
 2016 in women's road cycling
 2016 UCI Women's World Tour

References

Strade Bianche
Strade Bianche
Strade Bianche